IBM Quantum System One is the first circuit-based commercial quantum computer, introduced by IBM in January 2019.

This integrated quantum computing system is housed in a 2.7x2.7x2.7 m airtight glass cube that maintains a controlled physical environment. The cylinder protruding from the ceiling in the center is a dilution refrigerator, containing a 20-qubit transmon quantum processor. It was tested for the first time in the summer of 2018, for two weeks, in Milan, Italy.

IBM Quantum System One was developed by IBM Research, with assistance from the Map Project Office and Universal Design Studio. CERN, ExxonMobil, Fermilab, Argonne National Laboratory and Lawrence Berkeley National Laboratory are among the clients signed up to access the system remotely.

From April 6 to May 31, 2019, the Boston Museum of Science hosted an exhibit featuring a replica of the IBM Quantum System One.
On June 15, 2021, IBM deployed the first unit of Quantum System One in Germany at its headquarters in Ehningen.

See also
 IBM Eagle
 IBM Quantum Experience
 Timeline of quantum computing and communication
 Superconducting quantum computing
 Qiskit

References

External links
 Official website

Quantum computing
Computer-related introductions in 2019
IBM computers